Grey—Bruce was a federal electoral district represented in the House of Commons of Canada from 1935 to 1968. It was located in the province of Ontario. This riding was created in 1933 from parts of Bruce South and Grey Southeast ridings.

It consisted of the townships of Artemesia, Bentinck, Egremont, Glenelg, Normanby, Proton and Sullivan in the county of Grey; and the townships of Brant, Carrick and Elderslie in the county of Bruce.

The electoral district was abolished in 1966 when it was redistributed between Bruce, Grey—Simcoe and Wellington—Grey ridings.

Members of Parliament

This riding elected the following members of the House of Commons of Canada:

Election results

|}

|}

|}

|}

|}

|}

|}

|}

See also 

 List of Canadian federal electoral districts
 Past Canadian electoral districts

External links 
Riding history from the Library of Parliament

Former federal electoral districts of Ontario